Fortunato Catalon (born 14 October 1897, died 1959) was a Filipino track and field sprinter.

Born in Tolosa, Leyte, Catalon came from a family of rural farmers. He took up sports at Leyte High School, but failed in his initial attempts to join the school's track team. He took up baseball, but his talents for getting quickly to the bases were noticed and he began to train as a sprinter. A short man, his advantage over his rivals was that he was a quick starter. At a time when sprinting technique was less defined, Catalon—like most of his national peers—used to raise his arms in the air and push his chest forwards when crossing the finish line (as opposed to the lean-in technique which later became common).

He established himself as Asia's top sprinter at the age of nineteen by completing a double in the 100-yard dash and the 220-yard dash at the 1917 Far Eastern Championship Games in Tokyo. The third edition of the competition, he continued Filipino dominance in the sprints, becoming the second man to win that double (after Pio Robillos' wins in 1913) and succeeding teammates Genaro Saavedra and Nicolas Llaneta from the 1915 tournament. Fortunato's winning time of 10.0 seconds in the 100 yards was a new games record while his time of 23.8 seconds in the 220 yards was two tenths off Robillos tournament best. He returned to defend his title at the 1919 Manila Games and successfully did so by equalling his 100-yard record and bettering his 220-yard time to 23.0 seconds.

Catalon continued his success at the Far Eastern Championship Games with two further successive sprint doubles at the 1921 Shanghai Games and then the 1923 Manila Games. A 220-yard games record of 22.2 seconds came at the latter edition.

A run of 9.8 seconds in March 1923 ranked him sixth in the world rankings for the 100-yd dash that year. Upon meeting him while touring the Philippines, world record holder Charley Paddock of the United States called Catalon a "champion of champions". News of his near-world record runs spread to Western media through Fred England and Elwood Brown – the Americans who led the Philippine Amateur Athletic Association. His feats encouraged interest in the country of sending a Philippines team for the first time for the 1924 Paris Olympics. In the end it was another sprinter, his rival David Nepomuceno, that became the first Filipino to compete at the Olympics and he composed the entire one-man 1924 Filipino squad. Catalon was entered for the men's Olympic 100 metres and 200 metres, being drawn alongside America's Paddock in the former, but did not attend the games or start in those events.

It was his team mate Nepomuceno that finally broke his unbeaten regional status at the 1925 Far Eastern Championship Games held in Manila. While Catalon won a fifth straight title in the 100 metres, he was beaten into second place by Nepomuceno in the 200 metres. This brought Catalon's tally of individual medals at the competition to nine – a record in the athletics section by a margin of two (over Mikio Oda's seven eventual titles).

Following his retirement he became an official in the sport, acting as a race starter. His first major event in this role was at the 1934 Far Eastern Championship Games in Manila, where his compatriot Rafael de Leon became the last ever Far Eastern 100 metres champion. He was the starter for the 100 m final for the 1954 Asian Games, also held in Manila, and his lenient starting approach favoured Genaro Cabrera – the Filipino silver medallist. Catalon studied into his twenties and eventually received a college diploma from the University of Santo Tomas in Manila. He had a family, including two daughters – Gloria and Jovita. He was touted as a potential early 20th century candidate for admission into the Philippine Sports Hall of Fame. He died in 1959.

References

1897 births
1959 deaths
Filipino male sprinters
Sportspeople from Leyte (province)
University of Santo Tomas alumni